Aleksey Proshin (born 25 September 1974) is a Russian speed skater. He competed in two events at the 2006 Winter Olympics.

References

1974 births
Living people
Russian male speed skaters
Olympic speed skaters of Russia
Speed skaters at the 2006 Winter Olympics
Sportspeople from Krasnoyarsk